Cataetyx laticeps is a species of fish in the family Bythitidae (viviparous brotulas).

Description
It has 98–107 dorsal soft rays, 75–83 anal soft rays, 8 branchiostegal rays and 60 or 61 vertebrae.

Habitat
It lives in the Atlantic Ocean, Gulf of Mexico and Mediterranean Sea.

Behaviour
Cataetyx laticeps reproduces viviparously and is an obligate lecithotrophic live-bearer.

References

Bythitidae
Taxa named by Einar Laurentius Koefoed
Fish described in 1927